Yerevan Velodrome, is an outdoor velodrome or track cycling venue in Yerevan, Armenia. It was built to replace the old cycling track which was later demolished in 2012.

The construction of the venue began in June 2010 and completed in September 2011. It was officially opened on 15 September 2011 with the presence of the Armenian president Serzh Sargsyan.

The velodrome can provide a parking lot up to 240 cars.

The Armenian Cycling Federation headquarters is located on the premises of the velodrome.

Gallery

References

External links
Image of the Yerevan Velodrome
Yerevan Velodrome photos

Sports venues in Yerevan
Sports venues completed in 2011
Velodromes in Armenia
2011 establishments in Armenia